St Leonard's Catholic School is a coeducational Roman Catholic secondary school and sixth form. It is located in Durham, County Durham, England.

History
The school was founded in 1936 as the St Leonard's Catholic Central School in the former Springwell Hall, a coalmine owner's house acquired in 1935 by the Roman Catholic Diocese of Hexham and Newcastle.

During the era of the tripartite system, the school became a secondary modern and turned comprehensive in 1970 when the system was abolished by the LEA. The sixth form was opened that same year. During the last full Ofsted Inspection in 2007 the school was given an overall rating of good.

Previously a voluntary aided school administered by Durham County Council, in November 2016 St Leonard's Catholic School converted to academy status. The school is now sponsored by the Bishop Wilkinson Catholic Education Trust.

Ofsted judgements

The school was judged Good by Ofsted in 2019. In 2022 it was inspected again and judged to Require Improvement.

The Prime Minister's Global Fellowship
The school has a record of students attaining places on the Prime Minister's Global Fellowship programme. The school achieved its first student in the inaugural year of the programme, 2008, and in 2009 had 3 successful applicants.

Sport
The school has a rowing club, the St Leonard's School Boat Club.

Notable former pupils
 Stephen Cantwell (born 1996), cricketer
 Elliot Embleton
 Paddy and Martin McAloon, founders of the pop group Prefab Sprout

Sources

External links
 St Leonard's School website
 School history
 BBC: League tables

Secondary schools in County Durham
Educational institutions established in 1936
Catholic secondary schools in the Diocese of Hexham and Newcastle
Schools in Durham, England
Academies in County Durham
1936 establishments in England